Grant Stuart (born 2 August 1975) is an Australian former professional rugby league footballer who played in the 1990s. He played for the Balmain Tigers in 1994 and the Newcastle Knights from 1998 to 1999.

Playing career
Stuart made his first grade debut for Balmain in Round 13 1994 against Illawarra.  Stuart made a total of 7 appearances for Balmain as the club finished last on the table claiming the wooden spoon.  Stuart then joined Newcastle in 1998.  Stuart then went on to make 1 appearance in both 1998 and 1999 before retiring.

References

External links
http://www.rugbyleagueproject.org/players/Grant_Stuart/summary.html

1975 births
Living people
Australian rugby league players
Balmain Tigers players
Newcastle Knights players
Rugby league players from Sydney
Rugby league centres
Rugby league locks